Rivals is the fourth studio album by American nu metal band Coal Chamber. It was released on May 19, 2015.

Background
Rivals is Coal Chamber's first release since Dark Days (2002). On March 2, 2015, the first single released from the album was "I.O.U. Nothing". On March 9, 2015, the second single from the album, "Rivals", was released.

Music
Described as groove metal and nu metal, Rivals has been compared to all of the previous Coal Chamber albums, being described as most similar to the band's third album Dark Days. In a 2015 review of the album, 100% Rock magazine wrote that "Coal Chamber have taken the nu metal styling of the early 2000s and modernized the sound for the current day". The album Rivals shows Coal Chamber moving away from their gothic sound.

Track listing

Personnel
Dez Fafara – vocals
 Miguel Rascón – guitars
 Mike Cox – drums
 Nadja Peulen – bass
 Al Jourgensen – additional vocals (track 4)
 Mark Lewis – production, mixing, mastering

Charts

References

2015 albums
Coal Chamber albums
Groove metal albums
Napalm Records albums
Albums produced by Mark Lewis (music producer)